Little Dead Rotting Hood is a 2016 American horror film written by Gabriel Campisi and directed by Jared Cohn. It stars Eric Balfour, Bianca Santos, Romeo Miller, Patrick Muldoon, Heather Tom and Marina Sirtis.

The film is a Mockbuster of the Warner Bros. romance horror film Red Riding Hood.

Plot

Cast

Reception
On Culture Crypt the film has a review score of 35 out of 100 indicating "unfavorable reviews".

Phil Wheat of Nerdly wrote: We Are Indie Horror wrote:Little Dead Rotting Hood takes almost nothing from the classic story, simply keeping the character and the Lycan aspect for its own usage, and doing something fun and off-the-wall, which is something seldom seen in reboots, remakes, or reimaginings.

References

External links
 

2016 films
2016 horror films
The Asylum films
American action horror films
American supernatural horror films
Films based on Little Red Riding Hood
Films shot in California
Films set in California
2010s English-language films
Films directed by Jared Cohn
2010s American films